Seneca Buffalo Creek Casino is a casino in Buffalo, New York, United States. It is owned by the Seneca Nation of New York, through the Seneca Gaming Corporation. It opened as a temporary structure on July 3, 2007 and a permanent casino building opened on August 27, 2013. A much larger and more expensive investment had previously been planned, prior to the Great Recession. The casino attracts about 3 million visitors annually.

See also 

 Buffalo Creek Reservation

References

External links
Official Website
Seneca Buffalo Creek page from Seneca Gaming

Casinos in New York (state)
Casinos completed in 2007
Casino hotels
Native American casinos
Buildings and structures in Buffalo, New York
Seneca Nation of New York
Tourist attractions in Buffalo, New York
2007 establishments in New York (state)
Native American history of New York (state)